USAT Liberty was a United States Army cargo ship torpedoed by  in January 1942 and beached on the island of Bali, Indonesia. She had been built as a Design 1037 ship for the United States Shipping Board in World War I and had served in the United States Navy in that war as animal transport USS Liberty (ID-3461). She was also notable as the first ship constructed at Federal Shipbuilding, Kearny, New Jersey. In 1963 a volcanic eruption moved the ship off the beach, and Libertys wreck is now a popular dive site.

World War I
Liberty was launched on 19 June 1918 by the Federal Shipbuilding Company in Kearny, New Jersey, and acquired by the United States Navy on 7 October 1918 and commissioned the same day. Assigned to the Naval Overseas Transportation Service, Liberty departed the New York Navy Yard on 24 October 1918, arriving at Brest, France, with her cargo of horses on 8 November. Over the next 6 months, Liberty made two additional cruises from New York to France discharging both animal and general cargo at French ports. Loaded with 436 tons of U.S. Army cargo and 2,072 tons of steel rails, Liberty arrived at Newport News, Virginia, on 30 April 1919 from her final cruise. She was decommissioned there on 7 May and was returned to the United States Shipping Board the same day.

Between the wars
On 20 October 1929, Liberty collided with the French tug  at Le Havre, Seine Maritime, France. Dogue sank with the loss of two crew members.

On 23 November 1933, Liberty collided with the American cargo ship  in the Ambrose Channel. Ohioan was consequently beached near the West Bank Light.

World War II
By 1939, Liberty—although owned by the United States Maritime Commission (a successor to the USSB)—was employed by the Southgate-Nelson Corporation of Norfolk, Virginia. Southgate-Nelson was the operator of several packet lines, including the American Hampton Roads Line, the Yankee Line, and the Oriole Lines, but secondary sources do not indicate for which of these services Liberty sailed. In November 1940, Liberty was one of ten ships taken up by the United States Army for defense service.

At the time of the United States' entry into World War II in December 1941, USAT Liberty was in the Pacific. In January 1942, she was en route from Australia to the Philippines with a cargo of railway parts and rubber. US destroyer  and Dutch destroyer  took the damaged ship in tow attempting to reach Celukan bawang harbour at Singaraja, the Dutch port and administrative centre for the Lesser Sunda Islands, on the north coast of Bali. However she was taking too much water and so was beached on the eastern shore of Bali at Tulamben so that the cargo and fittings could be salvaged.

The wreck of USAT Liberty is often misidentified as USAT Liberty Glo or identified by the misnomer, USS Liberty. The wreck is sometimes incorrectly referred to as a Liberty ship, through confusion of the ship's name with the class of World War II-built standard design cargo ships.

Dive site 
The wreck is a great display of how nature creates life everywhere and great coral formations can be observed on the wreck's guns.

Gallery of wreck pictures

Explanatory notes

Citations

General and cited references 
 Diving at the USAT Liberty
 
 
 Info with photo and map of the Liberty at Tulamben

External links 
 

1918 ships
Buildings and structures in Bali
Design 1037 ships of the United States Navy
Maritime incidents in 1929
Maritime incidents in 1933
Maritime incidents in January 1942
Ships built in Kearny, New Jersey
Ships sunk by Japanese submarines
Transport ships of the United States Army
World War II shipwrecks in the Indian Ocean
Maritime incidents in 1963
Wreck diving sites
Design 1037 ships
Underwater diving sites in Indonesia